Tan Yu Sai (also spelt Tan Yu Saing) was a Burmese government official prominent during the Burmese Socialist Programme Party era. He served as one of the founding members of the Union Revolutionary Council from 2 March 1962 to 6 October 1970, and also a Minister for Trade. Tan Yu Sai was a Sino-Burmese. He was a brother-in-law of Ne Win's protege, Brigadier Tin Pe, who was married to Tan's sister, Thein Saing. Tan was married to Hla Hla.

References

Burmese military personnel
Burmese civil servants
Burmese politicians
Burmese people of Chinese descent
Burmese politicians of Chinese descent
Date of birth missing
Date of death missing